Lillian Porter (February 24, 1917, Alameda County, California – February 1, 1997, San Bernardino, California) was an American film and television actress.

Porter was born in Oakland, California, and attended schools in Los Angeles. In 1940 she was a member of 20th Century Fox's school of drama.

Porter married actor Russell Hayden on July 11, 1946, in Beverly Hills, California. In 1947 they went on tour across the United States, giving live performances. They remained married until his death in 1981, but apparently the union was childless.

After Hayden's death in 1981, Porter continued an annual event to raise money for a foundation that he had begun to help children who had serious health problems. The fund-raiser included food and entertainment and access to the Hayden Ranch, the only time the ranch was open to the public.

She died in 1997, several weeks before her 80th birthday from undisclosed causes.

References

External links
 
 

1917 births
1997 deaths
20th-century American actresses
People from Alameda County, California
American film actresses
American television actresses
Actresses from California
Actresses from Palm Springs, California